In human anatomy, the supinator is a broad muscle in the posterior compartment of the forearm, curved around the upper third of the radius. Its function is to supinate the forearm.

Structure
Supinator consists of two planes of fibers, between which the deep branch of the radial nerve ls. The two planes arise in common — the superficial one by tendinous (the initial portion of the muscle is actually just tendon) and the deeper by muscular fibers — from the supinator crest of the ulna, the lateral epicondyle of humerus, the radial collateral ligament, and the annular radial ligament.

The superficial fibers (pars superficialis) surround the upper part of the radius, and are inserted into the lateral edge of the radial tuberosity and the oblique line of the radius, as low down as the insertion of the pronator teres. The upper fibers (pars profunda) of the deeper plane form a sling-like fasciculus, which encircles the neck of the radius above the tuberosity and is attached to the back part of its medial surface; the greater part of this portion of the muscle is inserted into the dorsal and lateral surfaces of the body of the radius, midway between the oblique line and the head of the bone.

The proximal aspect of the superficial head is known as the arcade of Frohse or the supinator arch.

Innervation
It is innervated by the deep branch of the radial nerve. The deep branch then becomes the posterior interosseous nerve upon exiting the supinator muscle. Its nerve roots are primarily from C6, with some C5 involvement. There is also possible additional C7 innervation.

The radial nerve divides into deep and sensory superficial branches just proximal to the supinator muscle — an arrangement that can lead to entrapment and compression of the deep part, potentially resulting in selective paralysis of the muscles served by this nerve (the extensor muscles and the abductor pollicis longus.) Many possible causes are known for this nerve syndrome, known as supinator entrapment syndrome, including compression by various soft-tissued masses surrounding the nerve, and stress caused by repetitive supination and pronation.

Variation
The deep radial nerve passes through the belly of supinator in 70% of cases and via the arcade of Frohse in remaining cases.

Function
Encircling the radius, supinator brings the hand into the supinated position. In contrast to the biceps brachii, it is able to do this in all positions of elbow flexion and extension.

Supinator  always acts together with biceps, except when the elbow joint is extended. It is the most active muscle in forearm supination during unresisted supination, while biceps becomes increasingly active with heavy loading.  Supination strength decreases by 64% if supinator is disabled by, for example, injury.

History

Etymology
The term "supinator" can also refer more generally to a muscle that causes supination of a part of the body. In older texts, the term "supinator longus" was used to refer to the brachioradialis, and "supinator brevis" was used to describe the muscle now known as the supinator.

Additional images

Notes

References
 
 
 
 
 

Muscles of the upper limb